Songs of Faith & Inspiration is the second album by American recording gospel/soul female group the Sweet Inspirations, released in the U.S. on Atlantic Records in 1968. The album is the follow-up to the group's self-titled debut The Sweet Inspirations, and the sound is predominantly centered in the gospel genre.

The tracks were written by Cissy Drinkard (better known as Cissy Houston), Myrna Smith, Estelle Brown, and Sylvia Shernwell; the group's official name for the album is Cissy Drinkard & The Sweet Inspirations.

Track listing
Side A

"What a Friend" - 3:55

"I Shall Know Him" - 3:05

"Swing Low" - 3:04

"Guide Me" - 4:09

"Looking on the Bright Side" - 2:46

Side B

"He'll Fight" - 4:51

"Without a Doubt" - 2:33

"The 23rd Psalm" - 4:23

"Down by the Riverside" - 2:21

"Pilgrims of Sorrow" - 3:11

Personnel
Producer: Tom Dowd
Supervised: Jerry Wexler

References

External links
Sweet Inspirations: Songs of Faith & Inspiration

1968 albums
Sweet Inspirations albums
Albums produced by Tom Dowd
Atlantic Records albums